Eurella is a rural locality in the Maranoa Region, Queensland, Australia.

Eurella Postcode:  4462

Geography 
Eurella is bounded by the Maranoa River to the west.

The Warrego Highway and the Western railway line pass through the northern part of the locality from east (Muckadilla) to west (Amby) with the locality being served by Eurella railway station.

The predominant land use is grazing on native vegetation with some crop growing.

History 
The locality takes its name from the creek name, which in turn takes its name from the pastoral operated in 1861  by T.J. Saddler and Edward Eagle Moore in 1861. It is believed to be an Aboriginal word meaning eagle hawk.

Education 
There are no schools in Eurella. The nearest primary schools are Mitchell State School in neighbouring Mitchell to the north-west, Dunkeld State School in neighbouring Dunkeld to the south, and Roma State College in Roma to the east. The nearest secondary schools are Charleville State High School (to Year 12), Mitchell State School (to Year 10) and Roma State College (to Year 12).

References 

Maranoa Region
Localities in Queensland